George Michael Low (born Georg Michael Löw, June 10, 1926 – July 17, 1984) was an administrator at NASA and the 14th president of Rensselaer Polytechnic Institute. Low was one of the senior NASA officials who made numerous decisions as manager of the Apollo Spacecraft Program Office in the Apollo program of crewed missions to the Moon.

Early life and education
Low was born near Vienna, Austria, to Artur and Gertrude Löw (née Burger) who had a prosperous manufacturing business and was educated in private schools in Switzerland and England. His father died in 1934. When Nazi Germany occupied Austria in 1938, Low's family—being Jewish—emigrated to the United States. In 1943, Low graduated from Forest Hills High School, Forest Hills, New York, and entered Rensselaer Polytechnic Institute (RPI) where he joined the Delta Phi fraternity. His college education was interrupted by the Second World War and from 1944 to 1946, he served in the United States Army. During his military service, he became a naturalized American citizen and legally changed his name to George Michael Low.

After military service, Low returned to RPI and received his Bachelor of Science degree in aeronautical engineering in 1948. He then worked at Convair in Fort Worth, Texas, as a mathematician in an aerodynamics group. Low returned to RPI late in 1948 and received his Master of Science degree in aeronautical engineering in 1950.

NACA & NASA career

At Lewis Flight Propulsion Laboratory
After completing his M.S. degree, Low joined the National Advisory Committee for Aeronautics (NACA) as an engineer at the Lewis Flight Propulsion Laboratory in Cleveland, Ohio, (later the Lewis Research Center and now the Glenn Research Center). He worked as the head of the Fluid Mechanics Section (1954–1956) and chief of the Special Projects Branch (1956–1958). Low specialized in experimental and theoretical research in the fields of heat transfer, boundary layer flows, and internal aerodynamics. In addition, he worked on such space technology problems as orbit calculations, reentry paths, and space rendezvous techniques.

NASA Goett Committee 
During the summer and autumn of 1958, preceding the formation of the National Aeronautics and Space Administration (NASA), Low worked on a planning team to organize the new aerospace agency. Soon after NASA's formal organization in October 1958, Low transferred to the agency's headquarters in Washington, D.C., where he served as Chief of Manned Space Flight. In this capacity, he was closely involved in the planning of Projects Mercury, Gemini, and Apollo. Low made many significant contributions to early human spaceflight, including setting NASA long-range plans, testifying before Congress, speaking to the media, and presenting at industry conferences. Low was considered "the original moon zealot" at NASA and pushed for a lunar landing as NASA's long-range goal as part of the Goett Committee in 1959.  He pushed for industry studies for a lunar landing and announced the Apollo program to the world in July 1960 at NASA's first industry planning conference, and he wrote the lunar landing feasibility study (as a result of the so-called Low Committee he formed in the fall of 1960) that served as the background report for John F. Kennedy's decision to establish a lunar landing goal by the end of the 1960s.

Houston & APSO 
In February 1964, Low transferred to NASA's Manned Spacecraft Center in Houston, Texas, (now the Johnson Space Center) and served as Deputy Center Director. In April 1967, following the Apollo 1 fire, he was named manager of the Apollo Spacecraft Program Office (ASPO) where he was responsible for directing the changes to the Apollo spacecraft necessary to make it flightworthy. In this role he spearheaded the use of FMEA, failure mode and effects analysis, to rigorously define the possible risks to human space flight. Low also created and chaired the Configuration Control Board, which had as its purpose to monitor technical changes that could inadvertently affect some other part of the complex Apollo system, thereby helping assure future mission safety. Flight Director Glynn Lunney has suggested that Low "brought the [Apollo] program out of despair and brought it into the sunlight". This effort helped return the Apollo project schedule to the promised date for the Moon landing.

NASA Deputy Administrator 
George Low became NASA deputy administrator in December 1969, serving with Administrators Thomas O. Paine and James C. Fletcher. He served as acting administrator after Paine's resignation and is credited with helping to save the agency after the Nixon White House rejected Paine's expensive and unacceptable budget requests in the early 1970s. In these roles, he became one of the leading figures in the early development of the Space Shuttle, the Skylab program, and the Apollo-Soyuz Test Project.

Rocket engineer Wernher von Braun blamed Low for what he felt was shabby treatment in the early 1970s while he was at NASA Headquarters. According to Bob Ward's 2005 biography, von Braun believed Low was jealous of his fame and that Low helped force von Braun's unhappy departure from the space agency. However, another biography by space historian Michael J. Neufeld disputed Low's involvement in von Braun's resignation. Low's biography by Richard Jurek also disputes this account, indicating Low's efforts to try to retain and engage von Braun in strategic planning in the early 1970s and being pleased with von Braun's work.

President of Rensselaer Polytechnic Institute
Retiring from NASA in 1976, Low became president of RPI. He held that position until his death in 1984. He initiated the Rensselaer Technology Park. The New York State Center for Industrial Innovation was renamed the George M. Low Center for Industrial Innovation by RPI shortly after his death.

Personal life
In 1949, Low married Mary Ruth McNamara of Troy, New York. Between 1952 and 1963, they had five children: Mark S., Diane E., George David, John M., and Nancy A. His son David became an astronaut for NASA in 1985, flew three times on the Space Shuttle, and died in 2008.

On April 8, 1985, the White House announced that Low had been awarded the Presidential Medal of Freedom for his contributions to the fields of education and science.

In popular culture
In the 1996 TV movie, Apollo 11 Low was played by Dennis Lipscomb. In the 1998 miniseries From the Earth to the Moon he was played by Holmes Osborne.

References

Bibliography

External links
 Guide to the George M. Low Papers, 1930-1984

1926 births
1984 deaths
Deaths from cancer in the United States
Deputy Administrators of NASA
People from Fort Worth, Texas
Rensselaer Polytechnic Institute faculty
Rensselaer Polytechnic Institute alumni
Presidents of Rensselaer Polytechnic Institute
National Medal of Science laureates
United States Army soldiers
Presidential Medal of Freedom recipients
Forest Hills High School (New York) alumni
Jewish emigrants from Austria to the United States after the Anschluss
Nixon administration personnel
Ford administration personnel
United States Army personnel of World War II